Lego Creator is a theme of the Lego construction toys.

Lego Creator may also refer to:

 Lego Creator (video game), a PC game
Lego Creator: Knights' Kingdom
Lego Creator: Harry Potter